Zhang Lichang (16 July 1939 – 10 January 2008) was a Chinese politician. He was a member of the 16th Politburo of the Chinese Communist Party, and the Communist Party Secretary of Tianjin.

Zhang was born in July 1939, in Nanpi County, Hebei. He joined the Communist Youth League of China in April 1955, and began working in May 1958. He rose through a number of positions in Tianjin city government, before becoming mayor and Vice-Party Chief in June 1993. He was elevated to the position of Tianjin Communist Party Secretary in August 1997, and to the Politburo of the Chinese Communist Party in November 2002. He died following an illness on 10 January 2008.

References

1939 births
2008 deaths
Chinese Communist Party politicians from Hebei
Politicians from Cangzhou
People's Republic of China politicians from Hebei
Mayors of Tianjin
Members of the 16th Politburo of the Chinese Communist Party